The 1991 America East men's basketball tournament was hosted by the higher seeds in head-to-head matchups. The final was held at Matthews Arena on the campus of Northeastern University. Northeastern gained its seventh and final America East Conference Championship and an automatic berth to the NCAA tournament with its win over Maine. Northeastern was given the 16th seed in the East Regional of the NCAA Tournament and lost in the first round to North Carolina 101–66.

Bracket and Results

See also
America East Conference

References

America East Conference men's basketball tournament
1990–91 North Atlantic Conference men's basketball season